The Pendé River is a river in central Africa. It arises in Ouham-Pendé in the Central African Republic and flows north, forming a short part of the international boundary between the Central African Republic and Chad. It eventually merges with the Logone River near Kim.

Historically it gave its name to the French administrative district Pendé, which was ceded to Germany as part of Neukamerun at the treaty of Fez 1912.

Hydrometry 
The flow of the river observed over 28 years (1947–75) in Doba a town in Chad about 70 km above the mouth into the Logon. The at Doba observed average annual flow during this period was 128 m³ / s fed by an area of about 14.300 km ² a majority of the total catchment area of the River.

References 

Rivers of the Central African Republic
Rivers of Chad
International rivers of Africa
Central African Republic–Chad border
Border rivers